The Meitei language (officially known as Manipuri language) has a long history of literature and culture. Meitei language newspapers are either printed in Meitei script or in Bengali script or even in both. The following are some of the notable Meitei language newspapers published and circulated across Manipur, Assam and Tripura states of Northeast India as well as across some parts of Bangladesh and Canada.

See also 

 Directorate of Language Planning and Implementation
 List of Meitei-language television channels
 List of Meitei-language films
 Meitei Language Day
 Imphal Free Press

Footnotes

References

External links 

 
 
 
 
 
 

Meitei language
Meitei language-related lists
Meitei script
Manipur-related lists
Mass media in Manipur
Lists of newspapers published in India
Newspapers published in India
Newspapers published in India by language